Dr. Genea Brice is an American poet. She was the first Poet Laureate of Vallejo, California.

Biography

Genea S. Brice was born in Oakland, California and raised in Vallejo, California. She is a graduate of Hogan Senior High School in Vallejo. She holds a Bachelor of Arts in Liberal Studies with a concentration in English Literature and a Teaching Credential from Patten University. She went on to the Sacramento Theological Seminary and Bible College to earn her Master of Arts and doctorate in Theological Studies. In addition to becoming Vallejo's first poet laureate, she served on the Commission on Culture and the Arts. Following her service as poet laureate she briefly relocated to Dallas, Texas in 2018. She currently resides in Vacaville, California.

Poetry
A poetry aficionado since her youth, Brice advocated for the founding of the poet laureate program in Vallejo. She served as poet laureate of Vallejo, California from August 2015 to September 2017. During her tenure, she performed at several local events and celebrations, including Art Walk,
 Visions of the Wild, Women's History Month, Juneteenth, Martin Luther King Jr. Day, and a vigil after the Charlottesville car attack. She taught students about Martin Luther King Jr., gave presentations on Maya Angelou and Sonia Sanchez for Voices of Change and spoke about Ernest J. Gaines at the Solano County Library. Brice lead a monthly poetry circle, Poetry in Notion, and hosted annual shows for National Poetry Month. She also spoke at events for numerous organizations including Alpha Kappa Alpha, NAACP, Community Democratic Club, Delta Sigma Theta, The Links, Rotary Club, Harvest House, United States Forest Service, Soroptimist International, and Vallejo Sister Cities. She was succeeded as poet laureate by D.L. Lang in 2017.

In 2020 she performed at a rally against police violence in Vallejo. In 2021 she performed at a virtual benefit for the Solano County Library Foundation. She also read at the Juneteenth flag raising at Martin Luther King, Jr. park in Vallejo, and at another commemoration of Juneteenth in Suisun City. She also performed with her successors at Alibi Bookshop. In 2022 she read in Fairfield at a Juneteenth event for the Solano County Library. In 2023 she helped high school seniors with a Black History Month poetry project.

Works

Poetry collections
 A Way with Words: Poems, Prose, and other Masterpieces 2017.

Anthologies
Poeming Pigeons: Poems about Birds The Poetry Box. 2015.
Lang, D.L. ed., Verses, Voices, & Visions of Vallejo 2019.
The Colors of Life The International Library of Poetry. 2003.
The Best Poems and Poets of 2005 The International Library of Poetry. 2005.
A Word for All Seasons Benicia Literary Arts, 2014.

Publications
 Brice, Genea, “A Tuesday Text,” Benicia Herald, October 7, 2020.
 Brice, Genea, “Galveston,” Benicia Herald, June 18, 2021.
 Brice, Genea, “Vacaville,” The Diablo Gazette, April 2022.

Memoir
 Weaned in the Desert: Souvenirs from Sacred Seasons with my Savior Xulon Press. 2010.

See also
 D.L. Lang
 Jeremy Snyder
 List of municipal poets laureate in California

References

Living people
American women poets
Municipal Poets Laureate in the United States
Poets from California
People from Oakland, California
Writers from Vallejo, California
Year of birth missing (living people)
Poets Laureate of Vallejo
21st-century American women writers
21st-century American poets
African-American poets
21st-century African-American women writers
21st-century African-American writers